Pierre Bajoc (born 27 April 1955) is a French former professional football player and manager.

Playing career 
Bajoc began playing football in his hometown of Le Lamentin in Martinique. He played for Aiglon du Lamentin and L'Éclair de Rivière-Salée in his youth before joining Paris Saint-Germain in 1973, at the age of 18. Guy Nosibor also joined PSG from L'Éclair de Rivière-Salée that year.

On 23 September 1973, Bajoc made his debut for PSG in a 1–1 draw against Nevers. He played his final match for the club on 19 January 1980, a 3–1 loss to Laval. Bajoc left PSG in 1980 to join third division Le Mans. He stayed at the club until his retirement in 1985 despite being relegated to the fourth tier in 1981.

Managerial career 
After his retirement in 1985, Bajoc managed three different amateur clubs in the Sarthe department of France, in the towns of Connerré, Sainte-Jamme-sur-Sarthe, and La Milesse.

After football 
Later in his life, Bajoc worked for the city of Le Mans.

Career statistics

References 

1955 births
Living people
People from Le Lamentin
French footballers
Association football defenders
Aiglon du Lamentin players
Paris Saint-Germain F.C. players
Le Mans FC players
French football managers
Ligue 2 players
Ligue 1 players
French Division 3 (1971–1993) players
French Division 4 (1978–1993) players
French people of Martiniquais descent
Black French sportspeople
Martiniquais footballers